James Marcellin St. Vrain (June 6, 1871 – June 12, 1937), a native of Ralls County, Missouri, was a Major League Baseball pitcher.  The left-hander played for the Chicago Orphans in 1902.

St. Vrain made his major league debut in a road game against the Cincinnati Reds at the Palace of the Fans (April 20, 1902).  He pitched well, but the Orphans lost 2–1.  His first major league win came against the New York Giants on May 9.  He pitched a 5–0 complete game shutout in front of the home crowd at West Side Park.

St. Vrain pitched well during his only season but gave up a lot of unearned runs. He is also remembered for running the wrong way on the bases; although he was a left-handed pitcher, St. Vrain batted right-handed. One day, manager Frank Selee suggested he try batting left-handed, and upon making contact with the ball, St. Vrain was confused enough to run to third base (he was thrown out at first base).

In a total of 12 games, 11 starts, 10 complete games, and 95 innings pitched, he had 51 strikeouts and only 25 walks, and gave up just 22 earned runs. Though his record was 4–6, his earned run average was a sparkling 2.08.

St. Vrain died in Butte, Montana, in 1937.

References

External links

Retrosheet
SABR biography

1871 births
1937 deaths
Major League Baseball pitchers
Chicago Orphans players
Butte Smoke Eaters players
Tacoma Tigers players
Memphis Egyptians players
Minneapolis Millers (baseball) players
Seattle Siwashes players
Portland Giants players
Topeka White Sox players
St. Joseph Saints players
Baseball players from Missouri
People from Ralls County, Missouri